Keddric Mays (born September 17, 1984) is an American professional basketball player for Baltur Cento of the Italian Serie A2 Basket.

College career
Mays played junior college basketball at Cloud County Community College before moving to University of Tennessee at Chattanooga, where he graduated in 2007.

Pro career
He arrived in Europe in February 2008, signing with Espoon Honka from Finland. He played only one game before he was released. In September 2008 he moved to Universidad Católica in División Mayor del Básquetbol de Chile.

Season 2009-10 he spend with Znicz Jarosław of the Polish Basketball League. Next two years he spend in Ukraine playing with Ferro-ZNTU and Politekhnika-Halychyna.

In August 2012, Mays signed with Givova Scafati of the Italian Second League, where he played 32 games, averaging 18.2 points, 3.7 rebounds and 3.0 assists per game.

On July 8, 2013, Mays signed with KK Igokea. He was released in October, after playing only two games with them. Later that month he signed with Orlandina Basket for the rest of the season.

In July 2014, he signed a one-year deal with the French team SOMB Boulogne-sur-Mer. He left Boulogne after only 7 games. In January 2015, he signed with Mersin Büyükşehir Belediyesi of the Turkish Second League for the rest of the season.

On August 1, 2015, he signed a one-year deal with the Italian team Pallacanestro Trapani. On July 27, 2016, he re-signed with Trapani for one more season.

On August 26, 2017, Mays signed with the Israeli team Maccabi Kiryat Gat for the 2017–18 season. Mays helped Kiryat Gat to reach the 2018 Liga Leumit Finals where they eventually lost Hapoel Be'er Sheva.

On July 6, 2018, Mays returned to Italy for a fourth stint, signing a one-year deal with Baltur Cento of the Italian Serie A2 Basket.

References

External links
 Eurobasket.com profile
 FIBA.com profile

1984 births
Living people
20th-century African-American people
21st-century African-American sportspeople
African-American basketball players
American expatriate basketball people in Bosnia and Herzegovina
American expatriate basketball people in Chile
American expatriate basketball people in Finland
American expatriate basketball people in France
American expatriate basketball people in Israel
American expatriate basketball people in Italy
American expatriate basketball people in Poland
American expatriate basketball people in Turkey
American expatriate basketball people in Ukraine
American men's basketball players
Basketball players from Texas
BC Politekhnika-Halychyna players
BC Zaporizhya players
Espoon Honka players
Chattanooga Mocs men's basketball players
Junior college men's basketball players in the United States
KK Igokea players
Maccabi Kiryat Gat B.C. players
Mersin Büyükşehir Belediyesi S.K. players
Orlandina Basket players
Pallacanestro Trapani players
People from Lufkin, Texas
Point guards
Scafati Basket players
SOMB Boulogne-sur-Mer players